Elisa may refer to:

Arts and entertainment
 Elisa (1959 TV series), a telenovela
 Elisa (1979 TV series), a telenovela
 Elisa (album), a 2002 compilation album by Italian singer Elisa
 Élisa (film), a 1995 French film starring Gérard Depardieu and Vanessa Paradis
 Para Elisa, a 2013 Spanish-language thriller film
 An alternative spelling of Eliza (Cherubini), a 1794 opera by Cherubini

People
 Elisa (given name)
 Elisa (Japanese singer) (born 1989), Japanese singer and model
 Elisa (Italian singer) (born 1977), Italian singer and songwriter
 Subcomandante Elisa (born 1955), Zapatista activist

Other uses
 ELISA (enzyme-linked immunosorbent assay), a biochemical technique
 Elisa (company), a Finnish telecommunications company
 ELISA (satellite), a French military satellite series
 Evolved Laser Interferometer Space Antenna (eLISA), a proposed configuration for a space-based gravitational wave detector
 Elissa, another name of Dido, the queen of Carthage in Greek mythology

See also
 Elise (disambiguation)
 Eliza (disambiguation)
 Alisa (disambiguation)
 Lisa (disambiguation)